Franz Zauner (born 1904 in Grieskirchen) was an Austrian clergyman and bishop for the Roman Catholic Diocese of Linz. He was ordained in 1931. He was appointed bishop in 1961. He retired in 1980, and died in 1994.

References 

1904 births
1994 deaths
Austrian Roman Catholic bishops
People from Grieskirchen District